Tropidoptera heliciformis is a species of small, air-breathing land snail, a terrestrial pulmonate gastropod mollusk in the family Amastridae. This species is endemic to Oahu.

References

Molluscs of the United States
heliciformis
Taxonomy articles created by Polbot